"The Church on Cumberland Road" is a song written by Bob DiPiero, John Scott Sherrill and Dennis Robbins, and recorded by American country music group Shenandoah.  It was released in January 1989 as the second single from their album The Road Not Taken.  It was their first number-one hit in both the United States and Canada. In 2001, on a live CMT special, Rascal Flatts covered the song. It is also the first song the members of Rascal Flatts performed live together before officially forming in 1999. Robbins himself originally recorded the song and it served as the B-side to his 1987 MCA single "Two Of A Kind (Workin’ On A Full House)" which would later become a No. 1 country hit for Garth Brooks in 1991.

Music video
The music video was directed by Larry Boothby. It was the band's first music video, which according to drummer Mike McGuire, helped create more recognition for the band and its members.

Chart performance

Year-end charts

References

Shenandoah (band) songs
1989 singles
Songs written by Bob DiPiero
Songs written by John Scott Sherrill
Songs written by Dennis Robbins
Columbia Records singles
1989 songs